Mohamed  Haouas (born 9 March 1994) is a French rugby union player. His position is prop. He currently plays for the Montpellier Hérault in the Top 14.

Haouas was banned from playing for three weeks in 2020 after punching Scottish player Jamie Ritchie during the 2020 Six Nations Championship. In February 2023 he became the first ever player to be sent off twice playing for the French international team.

On Friday, February 4th, 2022, Haouas was sentenced for his role in a series of burglaries of tobacco merchants in France in 2014. He was handed an 18-month suspended prison sentence and fined the equivalent of £13,000.

Honours

International 
 France
Six Nations Championship: 2022
Grand Slam: 2022

Personal life
Haouas was born in France and is of Algerian descent.

References

External links
France profile at FFR
"Itsrugby" profile
 Mohamed Haouas on "montpellier-rugby.com"

1994 births
Living people
French rugby union players
France international rugby union players
French sportspeople of Algerian descent
Sportspeople from Le Havre
Montpellier Hérault Rugby players
Rugby union props